"Picture Me Rollin'" is a song by American recording artist Chris Brown from his seventh studio album Royalty. It was produced by Dr3amforever & Dj-Wes & GoldenBoy .

The song received positive reviews from music critics who noted it as one of the album's highlights, and celebrated its production, praising his '90s g-funk sound. The song peaked at number 50 on the US Hot R&B/Hip-Hop Songs chart.

Composition
"Picture Me Rollin'" is a G-funk song that shares its name with a Tupac single, which features influences by West Coast hip hop. The song itself contains elements of "Regulate" by Warren G and Nate Dogg from their album Regulate...G Funk Era and "Funk You Up" by The Sequence.

Critical reception
"Picture Me Rollin'" received positive reviews from music critics. Mike Pizzo of Las Vegas Weekly said that the song is the best song on Royalty. Jesse Cataldo of Slant Magazine described the song as "catchy", saying that the song is a revival of g-funk from the 90s. Marcus Dowling of HipHopDX praised the "gangsta vibe" of the song, comparing it to works by American rapper 2Pac.

Music video

On December 17, 2015 Brown uploaded the music video for "Picture Me Rollin'" on his YouTube and Vevo account. Scott Disick, French Montana, Kid Red, ASAP Ferg, and ASAP Rocky make cameo appearances in the video.

Synopsis
The video begins after the conclusion of Brown's "Anyway" music video. After breaking up with his girlfriend in his car, Brown gets a call from Scott Disick to slide through a house party, where he celebrates with his friends. He takes a break from partying to hang with a few girls in a bouncy castle and doing some dance moves, but things get heated when a goon cuts off the sound to start something with Brown. The video ends with Brown's friends that throw out the goon.

Charts

Weekly charts

References

2015 songs
Chris Brown songs